Cristina Georgiana Vărzaru (born 5 December 1979) is a Romanian retired professional handball player who last played for CSM București. She was a member of the Romanian national team.

Biography 
Vărzaru participated at the 2000 Summer Olympics where Romania finished seventh. She received a silver medal at the 2005 World Championship and a bronze one at the 2010 European World Championship.

She won the Champions League in 2006, 2009, 2010 and 2016,  first three with Viborg HK and the last with CSM București.

She was top goalscorer of the 2009–10 EHF Women's Champions League edition, with a total of 101 goals .

She was given the award of Cetățean de onoare ("Honorary Citizen") of the city of Bucharest in 2016.

Honours

Domestic 
Romanian Championship:
Champion: 1999, 2000, 2002, 2003, 2015, 2016, 2017
Romanian Cup:
Winner: 1999, 2002, 2004, 2016, 2017
Danish Championship:
Champion: 2006, 2008, 2009, 2010
Danish Cup:
Winner: 2007, 2008, 2009, 2010, 2011

European 
EHF Champions League:
Winner: 2006, 2009, 2010, 2016
Bronze Medalist: 2017
EHF Champions Trophy:
Winner: 2006
EHF Cup Winners' Cup:
Finalist: 2002, 2012

National team 
World Championship:
Silver Medallist: 2005
European Championship:
Bronze Medallist: 2010

Personal life 
Both parents are teachers. She has a twin sister, Anca, who graduated the Bucharest Academy of Economic Studies and who used to work for Big 4 companies. The other sister, Gabriela, is a Mathematics teacher in Râmnicu Vâlcea same as the father of the girls. Her mother is teacher of French.

References

External links 
 
 
 
 

1979 births
Living people
Romanian female handball players
Olympic handball players of Romania
Handball players at the 2000 Summer Olympics
Viborg HK players
Expatriate handball players
Romanian expatriate sportspeople in Denmark
SCM Râmnicu Vâlcea (handball) players
Expatriate sportspeople in Denmark
People from Corabia